Moses Kalfo was an Italian Jewish scholar who lived at the beginning of the eleventh century at Bari, where he taught at the yeshiva there. 

He is known through lexicographical explanations cited by Nathan ben Jehiel, author of the Arukh. Nathan ben Jehiel probably studied under him for some time.

References
Marco Mortara, Indice, p. 9; 
Hermann Vogelstein and Paul Rieger, Geschichte der Juden in Rom, i. 358, 362; 
Isaac Hirsch Weiss, Dor, iv. 308, note 9; 
Eliakim Carmoly, in Revue Orientale, ii. 116.

External links

Kalfo, Moses
People from Bari